Qeytaqi (also Romanized as Qeyţāqī) is a village in Shirin Darreh Rural District, in the Central District of Quchan County, Razavi Khorasan Province, Iran. At the 2006 census, its population was 356, in 77 families.

References 

Populated places in Quchan County